Fort Johnston, also known as Fort Geary, is a Civil War era earthen fort atop a  peak of Catoctin Mountain just west of Leesburg, Virginia. Constructed in the winter of 1861-62 following the Battle of Balls Bluff, it is one of three forts constructed to defend the town from the threat of possible invasion. The fort was only sporadically occupied by Confederates, as the main threat of invasion came from the east across the Potomac. In 1862, when Loudoun County was invaded by the Union army, the fort was abandoned and later occupied by the Federals who rechristened it Fort Geary in honor of their commander. Throughout the war, Leesburg was rarely held in force by either side of the conflict and the fort saw little use. Today, parts of the earthworks of the fort still exist, and are located on private property on Fort Johnston Road.

See also
 Fort Evans
 Fort Beauregard

External links
 Virginia Forts

References 
 Fitzhugh, Turner ed. Loudoun County and the Civil War. Willow Bend Books; Leebsurg, Va. 1961.
To the Sounds of the Guns:Forts Beauregard and Johnston

Loudoun County in the American Civil War
Johnston
Virginia in the American Civil War